The cycling competition at the Friendship Games consisted of two road cycling and five track cycling events (all men's). The individual road race was held at the Schleizer Dreieck race track in Schleiz, East Germany on 23 August 1984, the team road race was held in Forst, East Germany on 26 August 1984, while track cycling events were held at the  Velodrome of the Trade Unions Olympic Sports Centre in Moscow, Soviet Union between 18 and 22 August 1984.

Medal summary

Road cycling

Track cycling

Medal table

See also
 Cycling at the 1984 Summer Olympics

References

Friendship Games
Friendship Games
1984 in East German sport
1984 in Soviet sport
International cycle races hosted by Germany
Cycle races in the Soviet Union
1984 in German sport